Earle Solomonson (born September 2, 1947) is a former American football player and coach.  He served as the head football coach at North Dakota State University from 1985 to 1986 and at Montana State University from 1987 to 1991, compiling a career college football record of 39–42–1.  Solomonson won back-to-back NCAA Division II Football Championships with the North Dakota State Bison in 1985 and 1986.  He played college football at Augsburg College, from which he graduated in 1969.

Head coaching record

College

References

1947 births
Living people
Augsburg Auggies football players
Montana State Bobcats football coaches
North Dakota State Bison football coaches
High school football coaches in Minnesota
Sports coaches from Minneapolis
Players of American football from Minneapolis